Emrys Roberts may refer to:
 Emrys Roberts (Liberal politician) (1910–1990), Welsh Liberal politician and businessman
 Emrys Roberts (Plaid Cymru politician) (born 1931), Welsh nationalist political activist
 Emrys Roberts (poet) (1929–2012), Welsh language poet and author